EMDEX (Essential Medicines InDEX) is the most commonly used reference source of drug and therapeutic information by healthcare professionals in Nigeria. It was first published in 1991 as Nigeria's Essential Drugs (NED) Guide.
EMDEX drug information contents, arrangements and therapeutic recommendations are supported by several references and clinical guidelines notably WHO Model Formulary, WHO ATC (Anatomical Therapeutic Chemical) Classification System, Nigeria's Essential Medicines List and Standard Treatment Guidelines, etc. The information is regularly reviewed and updated by a select team of healthcare practitioners and academics.
The central objective of EMDEX has been to promote rational use of medicines through provision of independent drug information, and use of clinical guidelines and essential medicines list. It is the largest and up-to-date source of information on drug products approved for use in Nigeria by NAFDAC (National Agency for Food & Drug Administration & Control).
The use of EMDEX as a reference drug manual is endorsed by Pharmacists Council of Nigeria, Nursing & Midwifery Council of Nigeria and major health institutions. It is used both within and outside Nigeria by physicians, dentists, pharmacists, nurse practitioners, and auxiliary health workers at all levels of healthcare delivery. These healthcare providers rely on EMDEX for accuracy and completeness of drug information namely indications, contra-indications, precautions or warnings, adverse effects, dosages, and drug use in special populations like children, elderly, pregnancy & lactation.
EMDEX publications are also in the syllabus of various colleges & schools of medicine, pharmacy & nursing.

EMDEX as Nigeria's National Drug Formulary 
A national formulary is essentially a listing of available and affordable medicines that are relevant to the treatment of diseases in a particular country. It is usually a source of unbiased drug information and helps promote rational use of safe, effective and good quality medicines.

EMDEX Publications 
EMDEX vol. 1 (Drug Information for Healthcare Professionals) is published annually.
Other EMDEX print publications include:
 EMDEX vol. 2 (Nurses' Reference)
 EMDEX Paediatric Drug Guide
 Mini EMDEX (Clinician's Pocket Reference)
 EMDEX RapidRx – Quarterly Evidence-Based Medication Therapy Management Newsletter
 EMDEX API offers a comprehensive database of NAFDAC-approved drug products in Nigeria.

References

External links 
* WHO Model Formulary
 Nigeria's Essential Medicines List
 Nigeria's Standard Treatment Guidelines
 Nursing & Midwifery Council of Nigeria
 Access database of registered pharmaceuticals & allied products in Nigeria
 

Medical manuals
Pharmacology literature
Healthcare in Nigeria